Krystyna M. Skarżyńska (Krystyna Maria Skarżyńska) (born 2 May 1934) is a Polish geotechnical engineer, surveying engineer (literally "geodesist"), hydrologist, and educator.

Born in Żnin, she earned master's degree in water construction engineering from the Tadeusz Kościuszko University of Technology (1956) and doctoral degree in technical sciences (1964) and the  dr. hab.  degree in technical sciences (1970) both from the Warsaw University of Technology .

From 1960 to 2004 she was with the Department of Soil Mechanics and Terrestrial Construction (Katedrą Mechaniki Gruntów i Budownictwa Ziemnego) of the  Agricultural University of Kraków.

Awards
Krystyna Skarżyńska is a recipient of several state awards and decorations, including:
Knight's Cross of the Order of Polonia Restituta
 Gold Cross of Merit

References

1934 births
Living people
20th-century Polish educators
Polish civil engineers
Academic staff of the Agricultural University of Kraków
People from Żnin County